Loreto Convent was a Catholic convent which operated as a girls' school in Claremont, Western Australia between 1901 and 1976.

Building 
In 1894, businessman James Grave built the Osborne Hotel on a cliff-top in Claremont. Considered to be Perth's finest hotel, it had panoramic views of the Indian Ocean and Swan River and included a tower and raised turrets and was surrounded by two acres (0.8 ha) of landscaped gardens.  In 1898 Graves found himself "financially embarrassed" and sold the hotel to William Dalgety Moore.

Convent 
The property was purchased by the Catholic Institute of the Blessed Virgin Mary in 1901.  The convent was formally known as Loreto Osborne, Claremont.  A chapel and sleeping accommodation for the sisters were built in 1938 and in 1963 the old hotel building was demolished to make way for a new building.

In 1963 the senior pupils from Loreto Nedlands were moved to the Claremont school, and in 1977 Loreto Osborne amalgamated with St. Louis boys' school to form John XXIII College. The school remained the senior campus of the College until the latter's move to Mount Claremont in 1986, and the site was subsequently occupied by the Western Australian International College.

The convent buildings were demolished in 1990, with residential housing built on the location at 101-109 Bindaring Parade, Claremont.

Notable alumni
 Judy Davis, actor
 Jennifer Hagan, actor
 Judy Edwards, politician
 Eileen Joyce, pianist
 Margaret McAleer, politician
 Robin Miller, the "Sugarbird Lady", pioneering nurse aviator.

References

External links 
 Sketch of proposed convent, 1895 (NB: this was some time before the convent acquired the property so presumably was a concept drawing only)
 Photograph of Loreto Convent, Claremont, 1972

Defunct Catholic schools in Australia
Educational institutions established in 1901
Educational institutions disestablished in 1976
Claremont, Western Australia
Claremont
Convents in Australia
Defunct girls' schools in Australia
1901 establishments in Australia
1976 disestablishments in Australia
Demolished buildings and structures in Western Australia
Buildings and structures demolished in 1990